= Point (ice hockey) =

Ice hockey statistic summing a player's goals and assists

In ice hockey, a player is credited with one point for either a goal or an assist.

The total number of goals plus assists equals total points. In the National Hockey League (NHL), the Art Ross Trophy is awarded to the player who leads the league in points at the end of the regular season.
